Hamry (i.e. "hammer mills" in Czech) may refer to places in the Czech Republic:

Hamry (Chrudim District), a municipality and village in the Pardubice Region
Hamry (Klatovy District), a municipality and village in the Plzeň Region
Hamry, a village and part of Bystré (Svitavy District) in the Pardubice Region
Hamry, a village and part of Hradec (Havlíčkův Brod District) in the Pardubice Region
Hamry, a village and part of Plumlov in the Pardubice Region
Hamry nad Sázavou, a municipality and village in the Vysočina Region
Kryštofovy Hamry, a municipality and village in the Ústí nad Labem Region
Nové Hamry, a municipality and village in the Karlovy Vary Region
Staré Hamry, a municipality and village in the Moravian-Silesian Region
Velké Hamry, a town in the Liberec Region

See also
 Hamr (disambiguation), similar name of several Czech locations